Marat Anvaryevich Safin (born 7 June 1985) is a Russian former professional football player. He is an ethnic Tatar.

Club career
He made his Russian Football National League debut for FC Volga Ulyanovsk on 9 April 2008 in a game against FC Mashuk-KMV Pyatigorsk.

Honours
 Russian Professional Football League Zone Ural-Povolzhye Best Player: 2015–16.
 Russian Professional Football League Zone South Best Player: 2016–17.

References

External links
 

1985 births
People from Dimitrovgrad, Russia
Living people
Tatar people of Russia
Russian footballers
Association football midfielders
FC Armavir players
FC Zenit-Izhevsk players
FC Volga Ulyanovsk players
Sportspeople from Ulyanovsk Oblast